Red Roses is a 1940 Italian "white-telephones" comedy film directed by Vittorio De Sica and Giuseppe Amato and starring De Sica, Renée Saint-Cyr, and Vivi Gioi. It was De Sica's first film as a director. De Sica had previously appeared in a 1936 production of the stage play by Aldo De Benedetti on which it was based. It was shot at the Cinecitta Studios in Rome. The film's sets were designed by the art director Gastone Medin.

Plot
When Renée Saint-Cyr as Maria Verani, gets a delivery of a bunch of scarlet roses, it starts a series of events between the adulterers but the focus is on the spouses themselves. The husband Vittorio De Sica as Alberto Verani, test to see if she will betray him, but repents of his actions and goes back to her.

Cast
 Vittorio De Sica as Alberto Verani
 Renée Saint-Cyr as Maria Verani
 Umberto Melnati as Tommaso Savelli
 Vivi Gioi as Clara
 Luisella Beghi as Rosina, la cameriera
 Rubi Dalma as La contessa 
 Carlo Ranieri as Il giardiniere
 Livia Minelli as La fioraia
 Olga von Kollar
 Aristide Garbini

References

Bibliography
 Cardullo, Bert. Vittorio De Sica: Actor, Director, Auteur. Cambridge Scholars Publishing, 2009.

External links

1940 films
1940 comedy films
1940 directorial debut films
Italian comedy films
1940s Italian-language films
Italian black-and-white films
Films directed by Vittorio De Sica
Films directed by Giuseppe Amato
Films produced by Angelo Rizzoli
Minerva Film films
Films shot at Cinecittà Studios
1940s Italian films